Sari Kristiina Krooks (born 2 February 1968 in Vaasa) is a Finnish retired ice hockey player. She played on the women's ice hockey team for Finland at the 1998 Winter Olympics, and won a bronze medal.

References

External links
 

1968 births
Living people
Finnish women's ice hockey forwards
Ice hockey players at the 1998 Winter Olympics
Medalists at the 1998 Winter Olympics
Olympic bronze medalists for Finland
Olympic ice hockey players of Finland
Olympic medalists in ice hockey
Vaasan Sport Naiset players
York Lions women's ice hockey players
Ilves Naiset players
Sportspeople from Vaasa